Thomas Hache (1664–1747) was a French ébéniste.

Early life
Thomas Hache was born in 1664 in Grenoble. He learned Italian decoration in Chambery.

Career
Hache was articled to Michel Chevalier. From 1721 onwards, he designed furniture for the Duchess of Orleans.

Death and legacy
Hache died in 1747. His grandson, Jean-François Hache, became a notable ébéniste.

References

1664 births
1747 deaths
Businesspeople from Grenoble
French furniture makers